Thadivalasa or Tadivalasa (Village ID 581558) is a village located in Ponduru Mandal, Srikakulam district, Andhra Pradesh, India and about  from Srikakulam Town. According to the 2011 census it has a population of 2859 living in 727 households. Its main agriculture product is paddy growing.

References

External links
 http://wikimapia.org/11925870/Thadivalasa
 http://indiabyroad.in/thadivalasa-ponduru/

Villages in Srikakulam district